Tom Ortenberg (born 8 August 1960) is an American businessman.

Early life and career
Ortenberg was born to a Jewish family on 8 August 1960, in Briarcliff Manor, New York. He attended Pennsylvania State University and graduated in 1982. While there, he recognized his passion for film, showing recent theatrical movies on campus to raise money for non-profit student organizations. After moving to San Francisco, he began his film career with Columbia Pictures in 1985 as a clerk, and joined Hemdale Film Corporation in 1989, where he was president of distribution and marketing after the company filed for bankruptcy and laid off the C level officers of the company. He then joined Lionsgate Films as its president of theatrical films, where he was the first employee in its Los Angeles office. Ortenberg led Lionsgate's film division as it quickly grew into one of Hollywood's leading movie studios. In 2009, he left Lionsgate to join The Weinstein Company as president of theatrical films. In 2011, it was announced that he would be CEO of Open Road Films, a newly formed movie studio owned by the theatre chains AMC Theatres and Regal Entertainment Group. In 2016, he endorsed Bernie Sanders for President of the United States. Ortenberg left Open Road in 2017 after it was acquired by Tang Media Partners. He then started Briarcliff Entertainment, a distribution company.

Personal life
Ortenberg lives with his wife Edie and his three children, Jason, Andrew and Cole, in Santa Monica, California. He is a member of the Academy of Motion Pictures Arts and Sciences and is a trustee of the British Academy of Film and Television Arts.

References

External links

Living people
People from Briarcliff Manor, New York
American film studio executives
20th-century American Jews
Pennsylvania State University alumni
20th-century American businesspeople
1960 births
21st-century American Jews